The Empire Classic, formerly known as the 2K Sports Classic, is an annual college basketball event played in November at the beginning of the season and televised by ESPN.  Originally known as the Atlantic City Shootout and produced by the Gazelle Group, Inc., the event was first played in 1995. The following year, it became the Coaches vs. Cancer Classic as  a collaboration between the National Association of Basketball Coaches and the American Cancer Society in an effort to raise funds for cancer research.  In 2012, the tournament beneficiary became Wounded Warrior Project, resulting in the tournament being renamed the 2K Sports Classic. A new annual college basketball tournament benefiting cancer research, also called the Coaches Vs. Cancer Classic and hosted by the Barclays Center in Brooklyn, New York, was held from 2012 to 2014. In 2019, the event was renamed the 2K Empire Classic Benefiting Wounded Warrior Project, commonly referred to as the "Empire Classic."

Over its history, the Empire Classic has been played both as a showcase event and as a tournament. It most recently was played as a tournament in 2020. Villanova is the reigning Empire Classic champion, having defeated Arizona State 83–74 in the championship game on November 26, 2020. It became a showcase event in 2021.

History
The first two events were doubleheader showcases held at the Atlantic City Convention Center (now Boardwalk Hall). From 1997 through 2001, the event was played as a tournament. Princeton won the first tournament in 1997, which took place at Continental Airlines Arena in the New Jersey Meadowlands.

In 1998, the event moved to Madison Square Garden in New York City, where it remained through 2019. In both 2002 and 2003, it was played as a showcase doubleheader. In 2004, it became a tournament again, with a new format as a 16-team event with teams from 16 separate conferences. Four predetermined regional round hosts played two games at home and the winners play in the semifinals and finals at Madison Square Garden. Syracuse won the first tournament played in this format, beating Memphis, 77–62, in 2004.

In 2007, Gardner-Webb unexpectedly won at Kentucky, 84–68, and advanced to the semifinals at Madison Square Garden, preventing one of the tournament's marquee teams from playing there. To ensure that the marquee teams would play in the semifinals in the 2008 tournament, the semifinalists were predetermined, regardless of the results of the regional rounds. Beginning in 2009, the format was revised to a 12-team field and each team was guaranteed four games in the tournament, with the semifinalists advancing to Madison Square Garden and the remaining eight teams being split into two subregional tournaments played at predetermined campus sites.

In 2014, the tournament format changed again, with eight teams from eight separate conferences invited to the tournament. Two games were held at four different regional sites selected before the tournament. The semifinals and finals were held at Madison Square Garden and the remaining four teams played in a tournament format at a predetermined on-campus site. This format persisted through 2019.

With the COVID-19 pandemic raging in the United States during the 2020–21 NCAA Division I men's basketball season, the Empire Classic was one of the very few multiteam events held during the fall of 2020. With no fans permitted to attend, it took place behind closed doors at Mohegan Sun Arena in Uncasville, Connecticut. Only four teams participated. Baylor withdrew from it after head coach Scott Drew tested positive for COVID-19; Rhode Island replaced Baylor.

In 2021, the tournament format was dropped, and the Empire Classic took place as a showcase event at T-Mobile Arena on the Las Vegas Strip in Las Vegas, Nevada. Four teams participated, and the event consisted of two doubleheaders played over the course of two days,

Yearly champions, runners-up, and MVPs

Most appearances

Participants and brackets
* – Denotes overtime period

1995 
Showcase Format – No Tournament

1996 
Showcase Format – No Tournament

1997

1998

1999

2000

2001

2002 
Showcase Format – No Tournament

2003 
Showcase Format – No Tournament

2004 

 Syracuse
 Memphis
 Mississippi State
 California

 Alabama A&M
 Belmont
 Birmingham-Southern
 Bucknell

 Fairfield
 George Mason
 IPFW
 Northern Colorado

 Princeton
 Savannah State
 Saint Mary's
 UC-Riverside

2005 

 Florida
 Syracuse
 Wake Forest
 Texas Tech

 Albany
 Bethune-Cookman
 Cornell
 George Mason

 Georgia Southern
 Mississippi Valley State
 Oakland
 Portland

 St. Francis (Pennsylvania)
 St. Peter's
 San Jose State
 UC Irvine

2006 

 Maryland
 Michigan State
 Texas
 St. John's

 Alcorn State
 Brown
 Central Michigan
 Chicago State

 Hampton
 Loyola Maryland
 Navy
 New Orleans

 North Florida
 St. Bonaventure
 Vermont
 Youngstown State

2007 

 Memphis
 Connecticut
 Kentucky
 Oklahoma

 Alabama A&M
 Buffalo
 Central Arkansas
 Denver

 East Central (Oklahoma)
 Gardner-Webb
 Maine
 Morgan State

 Ohio Valley
 Richmond
 San Francisco
 Tennessee-Martin

2008 

 Duke 
 Michigan
 Southern Illinois
 UCLA

 Arkansas-Monticello
 California University of Pennsylvania
 Georgia Southern
 Houston

 IUPUI
 Massachusetts
 Miami (OH)
 Michigan Tech

 Northeastern
 Prairie View A&M
 Presbyterian
 Weber State

2009 

 Syracuse
 North Carolina
 Ohio State
 California

 Albany
 Alcorn State
 Detroit
 Florida International

 Robert Morris
 James Madison
 Murray State
 North Carolina Central

2010 

 Pittsburgh
 Illinois
 Maryland
 Texas

 Charleston
 UIC
 Louisiana Tech
 Navy

 Rhode Island
 Seattle
 Toledo
 UC Irvine

2011 

 Mississippi State
 Arizona
 St. John's
 Texas A&M

 Akron
 Duquesne
 Eastern Kentucky
 Hiram

 IU Kokomo
 Lehigh
 Liberty
 UDC

 Valparaiso
 William & Mary

2012 

 Alabama
 Villanova
 Purdue
 Oregon State

 Bucknell
 Hofstra
 Marshall
 New Mexico State

 Niagara
 Northern New Mexico
 South Dakota State
 UDC

 West Alabama

2013 

 Connecticut
 Indiana
 Boston College
 Washington

 Boston University
 Detroit
 Eastern Washington
 Florida Atlantic

 LIU Brooklyn
 Stony Brook
 Toledo
 UC Irvine

2014 

 Texas
 Syracuse
 Iowa
 California

 Alcorn State
 Hampton
 Kennesaw State
 North Dakota State

2015 

 Duke
 Georgetown 
 VCU
 Wisconsin

 Bryant 
 Prairie View A&M
 Radford
 Siena

2016 

 Michigan
 SMU
 Pittsburgh 
 Marquette

 Eastern Michigan
 Howard
 IUPUI
 Gardner-Webb

2017

2018

2019

2020 
The 2020 tournament was held November 25–26 behind closed doors at Mohegan Sun Arena in Uncasville, Connecticut as a result of COVID-19 pandemic-related restrictions.

2021 
The top two teams in the country, Gonzaga and UCLA, headlined the 27th annual Empire Classic, held at T-Mobile Arena on the Las Vegas Strip in Las Vegas, Nevada, on November 22 and 23. Joining them were Central Michigan and Bellarmine. The format reverted to a showcase event.

Showcase Format – No Tournament

2022 
The tournament took place at Barclays Center in Brooklyn, New York on November 21 and 22, 2022.

Game recaps: 

* – Denotes overtime period

References

External links
 Official website

College men's basketball competitions in the United States
College basketball competitions
Recurring sporting events established in 1995